Harold Charles Warnock (January 6, 1912 – February 8, 1997) was a Major League Baseball player. Warnock played for the St. Louis Browns in the 1935 season. In six games, he had two hits, both of them doubles, with two runs scored. He batted left-handed and he threw right-handed. He was born in New York and died in Tucson, Arizona.

Warnock attended the University of Arizona where he played basketball and baseball for the Wildcats. He graduated from the University of Arizona College of Law in 1935, the same year as his brief Major League career, and practiced law in Arizona. He served in the United States Navy during World War II.

References

External links

1912 births
1997 deaths
Arizona Wildcats baseball players
Baseball players from New York (state)
St. Louis Browns players
San Antonio Missions players
Palestine Pals players
Arizona Wildcats men's basketball players
Arizona lawyers
James E. Rogers College of Law alumni
United States Navy personnel of World War II